WBLY-LP (101.5 FM) is a Christian radio station licensed to serve the community of Sycamore, Georgia. The station is owned by Bethel Baptist Church of Sycamore, Georgia, Inc. It airs a Southern Gospel/religious format.

The station was assigned the WBLY-LP call letters by the Federal Communications Commission on June 12, 2003.

References

External links
 Official Website
 

BLY-LP
Radio stations established in 2005
2005 establishments in Georgia (U.S. state)
Southern Gospel radio stations in the United States
Turner County, Georgia
BLY-LP